Nora Aída Bicet Juan (born 29 October 1977) is a female Spanish-Cuban javelin thrower.

Career

She finished seventh at the 2004 Olympic Games. Her personal best throw was 63.32 metres, achieved in July 2004 in Tallinn.

Achievements

External links

sports-reference
Picture of Nora Aída Bicet Juan

References

1977 births
Living people
Cuban female javelin throwers
Spanish female javelin throwers
Athletes (track and field) at the 2004 Summer Olympics
Olympic athletes of Cuba
Athletes (track and field) at the 2012 Summer Olympics
Olympic athletes of Spain
Cuban emigrants to Spain
Mediterranean Games bronze medalists for Spain
Mediterranean Games medalists in athletics
Athletes (track and field) at the 2013 Mediterranean Games